James Perry (born ) is a Republican member of the North Carolina State Senate, representing the 7th district. He was appointed to the state Senate on January 31, 2019 by Governor Roy Cooper, to replace Louis Pate, who resigned due to health reasons. He was chosen as Majority Whip for the 2021-2022 Biennium. Perry was challenged in the 2020 Republican Primary. He won the primary with 66% of the vote and won 86% of the vote in his home county of Lenoir.  At the general election he defeated his opponent by 11 points.

Perry serves on Health Care, Appropriations on Health and Human Services, Commerce and Insurance, Pensions and Retirement and Aging, and State and Local Government Committees. Additionally, Perry serves on the Child Fatality Task Force.

Electoral history

2022

2020

References

|-

Living people
1970s births
People from Kinston, North Carolina
North Carolina State University alumni
UNC Kenan–Flagler Business School alumni
Republican Party North Carolina state senators
21st-century American politicians